Želnava is a municipality and village in Prachatice District in the South Bohemian Region of the Czech Republic. It has about 100 inhabitants.

Administrative parts
Hamlets of Slunečná and Záhvozdí are administrative parts of Želnava.

References

Villages in Prachatice District
Bohemian Forest